David Sigachev (also transliterated Sigacev, born 6 January 1989 in Moscow) is a Russian race car driver.

Career
Sigachev started his racing career from karting. He made the move into single-seaters in 2007, with a campaign in the inaugural Formula Renault 2.0 Northern European Cup. Driving for SL Formula Racing, he finished twenty-first in the standings. He also took part in two Eurocup Formula Renault 2.0 races with the same team, failing to score a point. Sigachev missed the entire 2008 season due to sponsorship problems. In 2009 he moved to Porsche Supercup category with tolimit Seyffarth Motorsport.

Racing record

Career summary

† - As Sigachev was a guest driver, he was ineligible to score points.

Complete Porsche Supercup results
(key) (Races in bold indicate pole position) (Races in italics indicate fastest lap)

External links
 
 

Russian racing drivers
1989 births
Living people
Formula Renault Eurocup drivers
Formula Renault 2.0 NEC drivers
Porsche Supercup drivers
ADAC GT Masters drivers
Sportspeople from Moscow

Porsche Carrera Cup Germany drivers